Palpita indannulata is a moth in the family Crambidae. It was described by Inoue in 1996. It is found in Nepal, China (Guangdong), north-eastern India, Thailand, Indonesia (Sumatra, Java), the Philippines, Papua New Guinea, and Australia.

References

Moths described in 1996
Palpita
Moths of Asia
Moths of Oceania